Lasiogyia is a monotypic moth genus of the family Crambidae described by George Hampson in 1907. It contains only one species, Lasiogyia xanthozonata, described by the same author in the same year, which is found in New Guinea.

References

Acentropinae
Monotypic moth genera
Moths of New Guinea
Crambidae genera
Taxa named by George Hampson